Seamus Boxley (born September 21, 1982) is a former American former professional basketball player. Boxley played the power forward position. He played college basketball for Portland State, and after that spent time playing professionally in the Netherlands, Germany, Austria, Ukraine and Belgium.

Career
On July 2, 2013 Boxley signed with BC Goverla. His contract was dissolved in March 2014 because of the 2014 Ukrainian revolution.

For the 2014–15 season Boxley signed with the newly formed Belgian team Limburg United. On March 24, 2015, he extended his contract with Limburg for one more season. However at the end of the season he left Limburg. On July 8, 2015, he signed a one-year deal with Spirou Charleroi.

After the 2015–16 season, Boxley retired.

Honours

Club
Matrixx Magixx
NBB Cup (1): 2006–07
ZZ Leiden
Dutch Basketball League: 2010–11
NBB Cup (2): 2009–10, 2011–12
Dutch Supercup: 2011

Individual
ZZ Leiden
DBL Most Valuable Player: 2011–12
DBL All-Star Team (2): 2010–11, 2011–12
DBL All-Star (4): 2009, 2010, 2011, 2012
Oberwart Gunners
ÖBL Most Valuable Player: 2012–13

Career statistics

Domestic leagues

|-
| align=left | 2008–09
| style="text-align:left;" rowspan=4 | ZZ Leiden
| style="text-align:center;" rowspan=4 | DBL
| 34 || || 34.4 || .473 || .276 || .632 || 6.8 || 2.4 || 1.1 || 0.6 || 13.6
|-
| align=left |2009–10
| 31 || || 34.0 || .552 || .261 || .686 || 6.9 || 2.6 || 0.9 || 1.1 || 16.6
|-
| align=left style="background:#afe6ba;"| 2010–11†
| 35 || || 33.4 || .564 || .366 || .665 || 6.3 || 2.5 || 1.0 || 0.7 || 15.7
|-
| align=left |2011–12
| 40 || || 32.6 || .506 || .208 || .711 || 6.6 || 2.3 || 0.9 || 0.8 || 14.8
|-
| align=left |2012–13
| style="text-align:left;"| Oberwart Gunners
|  style="text-align:center;"| ÖBL
| 32 || || 35.2 || .555 || .266 || .758 || 6.7 || 3.0 || 0.9 || 0.7 || 18.6
|-
| align=left |2013–14
| style="text-align:left;"| Goverla
|  style="text-align:center;"| SuperLeague
| 17 || || 32.8 || .519 || .146 ||  .694 || 7.8 || 2.2 || 0.9 || 0.4 || 13.2
|-
|}

References

External links
Belgian League profile
Profile at eurobasket.com
Profile at fiba.com

1982 births
Living people
American expatriate basketball people in Austria
American expatriate basketball people in Belgium
American expatriate basketball people in China
American expatriate basketball people in Germany
American expatriate basketball people in the Netherlands
American expatriate basketball people in Ukraine
American men's basketball players
Basketball players from Washington (state)
BC Hoverla players
B.S. Leiden players
Dutch Basketball League players
Fujian Sturgeons players
Giessen 46ers players
Limburg United players
Matrixx Magixx players
Oberwart Gunners players
People from Mountlake Terrace, Washington
Portland State Vikings men's basketball players
Power forwards (basketball)
Spirou Charleroi players
Sportspeople from the Seattle metropolitan area
Tulsa 66ers players